Piruauna tuberosa is a species of beetle in the family Cerambycidae, and the only species in the genus Piruauna. It was described by Galileo and Martins in 1998.

References

Desmiphorini
Beetles described in 1998
Monotypic beetle genera